Berkley is an unincorporated community and a census-designated place (CDP) located in and governed by Adams County, Colorado, United States. The CDP is a part of the Denver–Aurora–Lakewood, CO Metropolitan Statistical Area. The population of the Berkley CDP was 12,536 at the United States Census 2020. Denver post office 80221 serves the area.

Geography

Demographics

See also

Outline of Colorado
Index of Colorado-related articles
State of Colorado
Colorado cities and towns
Colorado census designated places
Colorado counties
Adams County, Colorado
List of statistical areas in Colorado
Front Range Urban Corridor
North Central Colorado Urban Area
Denver-Aurora-Boulder, CO Combined Statistical Area
Denver-Aurora-Broomfield, CO Metropolitan Statistical Area

References

External links

Adams County website

Census-designated places in Adams County, Colorado
Census-designated places in Colorado
Denver metropolitan area